Solo is the third studio album by the Swedish progressive rock band Kaipa. It was released in 1977 by Decca Records.

Track listing
"Den Skrattande Grevinnan" (Roine Stolt) – 4:46
"Sen Repris" (Mats Löfgren, Roine Stolt) – 3:22
"Flytet" (Roine Stolt) – 2:46
"Anar Dig" (Mats Löfgren, Roine Stolt) – 4:05
"Frog Funk" (Roine Stolt) – 3:35
"Visan i Sommaren" (Hans Lundin) – 3:35
"Tajgan" (Hans Lundin) – 3:25
"Respektera Min Värld" (Mats Löfgren, Hans Lundin, Ingemar Bergman) – 6:16
"En Igelkotts Död" (Hans Lundin) – 3:40
"Total Förvirring" (Mats Löfgren, Roine Stolt) – 7:25
"Sist På Plan" (Mats Löfgren), Roine Stolt) – 7:38
"Visan I Sommaren (Live) (Bonus Track on Musea) - 3:31
"En Igelkotts Dod/Omsom Sken (Medley) (Live) (Bonus Track on Musea) - 4:40
"Live in an Elevator (Bonus Track on Musea) - 10:34

Personnel
Ingemar Bergman: Drums, Percussion & Laughing
Mats Lindberg: Bass, Moog Taurus Pedals & Percussion
Hans Lundin: Hammond Organ, Fender Rhodes Electric Piano, Grand Piano, Mellotron, Mini and Polymoog Synths, Korg String 2000, Hohner Clavinet & Vocal
Roine Stolt: 6 and 12-String Electric Guitars, Acoustic Guitars, guitar-Synthesizer, Percussion & Vocal
Mats Löfgren: Lead Vocal & Percussion
Engineered By Olle Ramm

Kaipa albums
1978 albums